Dudurkote is a small town in the subdivision of Hindol in the Dhenkanal District of Orissa state. It is surrounded by reserve forest from the East, South and West. It was a part of the Hindol princely State before independence.

History 
Dudurkote is popularly known as Dudurkote Garha and the old capital of Hindol princely State, with the Orissa States Agency during the British Raj. After the East India Company occupied Orissa in September–October 1803, several treaties were signed with estates of the region, including Dudurkote and Hindol. After India gained independence, it merged into Republic of India in 1947.

Festivals 
Dudurkote witnesses 10 festivals every year, of which three are major. The most important of these are the Rath Yatra, Dussehra, Bhagavad Temple Puja, Ramachandi Puja, Dulla Purnima, Laxmi Puja, Pana Sankranti, Danda Puja, Sabitri Puja, Astapahari Puja,

References

External links 
Maps of India

Cities and towns in Dhenkanal district